Anoux is a commune in the Meurthe-et-Moselle department in northeastern France.

Geography 
Anoux is a rural commune, as it is one of the communes with low or very low density, according to the Insee communal density grid.

The municipalities adjacent to Anoux are Val de Briey, Mairy-Mainville, Tucquegnieux, Lantéfontaine and Norroy-le-sec.

The village is a linear settlement.

Population

Toponymy 
The origin of the name of the village is not clearly established, however several assumptions have been made.

The first official mention of the name of the commune goes back to the 15th century. It is then designated under the names of Aunou, Alnova or Anow.

The -OW ending of Anow may suggest that the name of the village is of Gallic origin. However, it has also been assumed that the name Alnova could be related to the Latin name Alnoleum, meaning place planted with alders.

Thereafter, Anoux will be designated under the name : Alnowe devant Briey (1437), Anowe (1489), Anoult or Anoul (1519), Anou (17th century), Anould (1669-1670), Anoud or Anoux (1689), Annoux (1756) and then, Anoux (1793).

Local culture

The legend of St. Paulinus 
A legend tells that St. Paulinus, the patron saint of Anoux, performed a miracle in the village. According to this story, Paulinus of Nola, then bishop of Trier and accompanied by soldiers, was on his way to fight the barbarian invasions. While the troop was dying of thirst, overwhelmed by the August sun, a stop was made at Anoux, where the bishop made a spring flow. It was nicknamed the Bonne Fontaine (Good Fountain) and the legend tells that its water could cure several diseases.

See also 
 Communes of the Meurthe-et-Moselle department

References

Communes of Meurthe-et-Moselle